In geometry, the truncated order-4 pentagonal tiling is a uniform tiling of the hyperbolic plane. It has Schläfli symbol of t0,1{5,4}.

Uniform colorings 
A half symmetry [1+,4,5] = [5,5] coloring can be constructed with two colors of decagons. This coloring is called a truncated pentapentagonal tiling.

Symmetry 
There is only one subgroup of [5,5], [5,5]+, removing all the mirrors. This symmetry can be doubled to 542 symmetry by adding a bisecting mirror.

Related polyhedra and tiling

References
 John H. Conway, Heidi Burgiel, Chaim Goodman-Strass, The Symmetries of Things 2008,  (Chapter 19, The Hyperbolic Archimedean Tessellations)

See also

Uniform tilings in hyperbolic plane
List of regular polytopes

External links 

 Hyperbolic and Spherical Tiling Gallery
 KaleidoTile 3: Educational software to create spherical, planar and hyperbolic tilings
 Hyperbolic Planar Tessellations, Don Hatch

Hyperbolic tilings
Isogonal tilings
Order-4 tilings
Pentagonal tilings
Truncated tilings
Uniform tilings